The Temple University Diamond Marching Band, sometimes simply the Diamond Marching Band or TUDMB is the official marching band of Temple University. It performs at all home Temple Owls football games. In addition, a subdivision of the TUDMB plays at all Temple Owls men's basketball games and at least half of all Temple Owls women's basketball. The TUDMB also played at the first Sugar Bowl in 1935.

History
The Temple University Diamond Marching Band was started in 1925 by Herbert E. McMahan, under the direction of Charles Golder. George Otto Frey assumed the director position in 1926 and H. Edward Pike became the TUDMB's first full-time director the following year. Under Pike's direction, the band started forming the Temple "T" on the field, a tradition that is still present today. Under the direction of Dr. John H. Jenny, who replaced Pike in 1946, the band was renamed the Diamond Band. A new position, Director of Athletic Bands, was created to oversee the TUDMB and Basketball Bands. The position is currently held by Dr. Matthew Brunner alongside the Director of Bands Dr. Patricia Cornett. David Payne serves as the voice of the Diamond Marching Band.

In popular culture
The Temple University Diamond Marching Band appeared in the The Wolf of Wall Street (2013 film). The Diamond Band also appears in Annie (2014 film). The Diamond Band has also appeared on the Tonight Show alongside rappers Yung Thug and Gunna.

Uniform
The Diamond Band Uniform consists of cherry red bibbers with a white stripe, a cherry and white coat with the Temple University T on the chest, a Shako style hat, and white shoes. The Diamond Band jacket has "TEMPLE" across the back.

Instrumentation
 Baton Twirlers
 Color guard
 Flutes and Piccolo
 Clarinets
 Trumpets
 Mellophones
 Alto Saxophones
 Tenor Saxophones
 Trombones
 Baritones
 Drumline
 Sousaphone

References

External links
 Temple Bands Website

College marching bands in the United States
American Athletic Conference marching bands
Temple University
Musical groups from Philadelphia